Slow Motion is the eleventh  studio album by the English rock band Supertramp, released in April 2002.

Overview
In North America, Slow Motion was only available via mail-order from the band's website, released on their own label, and is the final album to date of new music from Supertramp as a band. 

The song "Goldrush" was actually written in the early 1970s under the first Supertramp line-up, by original guitarist Richard Palmer-James, and was used as the opening number in all their shows prior to Crime of the Century. The band had tried to record it on several previous occasions, but had never before been able to recreate it in the studio to their satisfaction. While the album credits the song to Davies and Palmer-James only, Roger Hodgson has supposedly co-written it.

Reception

AllMusic wrote that the songs and blending of styles are brilliant, but that what would otherwise have been an outstanding album was spoiled by shoddy production.

Track listing
All songs written by Rick Davies, except where noted.

"Slow Motion" – 3:50
"Little By Little" – 4:30
"Broken Hearted" – 4:28
"Over You" – 5:06
"Tenth Avenue Breakdown" – 8:57
"A Sting in the Tail" – 5:17
"Bee in Your Bonnet" – 6:27
"Goldrush" (Rick Davies, Richard Palmer-James) – 3:06
"Dead Man's Blues" – 8:26

Personnel
Supertramp
Rick Davies – keyboards, lead vocals, harmonica
John Helliwell – saxophone, woodwinds
Lee Thornburg – trumpet, backing vocals, trombone
Carl Verheyen – guitars
Mark Hart – keyboards, backing vocals, guitars
Cliff Hugo – bass
Bob Siebenberg – drums
Jesse Siebenberg – percussion, backing vocals

Production
Producers: Rick Davies, Mark Hart, Jay Messina
Engineer: Jay Messina
Mastering: Greg Calbi
Pro-tools: Seth McClain
Photography: Jean Ber, Richard Frankel

Charts and certfications

Weekly charts

Year-end charts

Certifications and sales

References

Supertramp albums
2002 albums
Albums produced by Rick Davies
EMI Records albums